Courage Productions runs the Miss BC pageant, including the Mrs. BC, Miss Teen BC, and Miss Charity BC titles. It was founded in Langley in 2002 by Darren Storsley. The final pageant night is televised by Shaw TV. The pageant has not been held since 2019 due to the Covid-19 pandemic.

History 
The Miss BC pageant is organized by Darren Storsley and is part of Courage Productions. Since 2006, the pageant has been held at the Langley Fine Arts School in Fort Langley, British Columbia. Miss BC does not have limitations on its contestants' height, weight, and age, but instead claims to focus on "inner beauty", with an emphasis on life skills and charity fundraising. In 2017, the pageant announced a 15-year reunion, with many of the past winners joining together in celebration. Miss BC pageants raise money for the Canadian Cancer Society's Cops for Cancer fundraiser. To date, the pageants have raised over $400,000 for the charity.

Famous guests have occasionally attended to assist with hosting or performing, such as Monte Durham from Say Yes to the Dress:Atlanta.

Courage Productions also briefly ran the Top Teen of Canada pageant in 2008-2009, which was discontinued.

Titles 
The primary titles awarded at the Miss BC pageant are Miss BC, Mrs. BC, Miss Teen BC, and Miss Charity BC. The Mrs. BC title was introduced in 2011 and is a category specifically aimed at married women. As part of the 15th Miss BC pageant, the competition introduced the Junior Miss BC title for girls aged 9 to 12. The runners up in the Junior Miss BC competition are given the title "Sparkle Ambassadors".

The Miss BC pageant also awards regional titles for the Fraser Valley, the Greater Vancouver area, the Lower Mainland, Northern BC, Vancouver Island, BC Interior and most recently, Southwest BC. In addition, the pageant gives out a Miss Congeniality award and a Heart & Soul award as voted on by contestants, and has a People's Choice Award as voted on by British Columbians.

Winners

Meghan Price was the Top Teen of Canada winner in 2008.

Miss BC at National & International Pageants 

The Miss BC pageant is a Miss World Canada qualifier. Several of the pageant winners have gone on to win or compete in national and international pageants.

Notable examples include:
 Bremiella de Guzman won the Miss Canada pageant in 2020.
 Christine Jamieson won the Miss Canada pageant in 2019 and placed 2nd runner up at the Miss Continents 2019 pageant.
 Tara Teng won Miss Canada in 2011 and Miss World Canada in 2012. She was also a contestant in the 2012 Miss World pageant.
 Shalom Reimer won the Miss Teen Canada pageant in 2016.
 Gloren Guelos won Miss Supranational Canada 2019. She was also a contestant in the Miss Universe Canada 2018 pageant and in the Miss World Canada 2019 pageant. 
Patricia Celan won Mrs. Canada 2021 and made international headlines for shaving her head for a cancer charity following her Miss Charity BC 2013 crowning.
Grace Pacifica Chen was a contestant in Miss Chinese Vancouver 2009. She was also a contestant in Miss Supranational 2015 and Miss Grand International 2016.
Courtnee Anderson was a contestant in the Miss Earth Canada pageant in 2011.

Miss World Canada

Hosts & Judges 
Darren Storsley is the host and founder of the pageant. He was also a pageant winner himself; Mr. Canada in 2003, winner of the Canadian Male Model Search in 2004, and Mr. World Canada in 2007. Storsley is employed as a teacher at Langley Fine Arts School. He is a gay man, is the faculty advisor for the school's gay–straight alliance, and represented Canada at Manhunt International.

See also
Miss World Canada

References

External links
 Official Website
 Facebook
 Instagram

Miss World Canada
Beauty pageants in Canada
Canadian awards
Recurring events established in 2002
2002 establishments in British Columbia